Anna Matzourani (1935 - 9 January 1991) was a Greek actress. She was born in Athens and she appeared in more than forty films from 1958 to 1989.

Selected filmography

References

External links 

1935 births
1991 deaths
Greek film actresses
Deaths from cancer in Greece
Actresses from Athens